Kue bagea (also called sago cake) is a cake originating from Ternate in North Maluku, Indonesia. It has a round shape and creamy color. Bagea has a hard consistency that can be softened in tea or water, to make it easier to chew.  It is prepared using sago, a plant-based starch derived from the sago palm or sago cycad.

See also

Kue

References

Kue
Indonesian cuisine